The Afghanistan Campaign Medal (ACM) is a military award of the United States Armed Forces which was created by Executive Order 13363 of President George W. Bush on November 29, 2004, and became available for general distribution in June 2005. The medal was designed by the U.S. Army Institute of Heraldry.

The Afghanistan Campaign Medal is awarded to any member of the United States military who has performed duty within the borders of Afghanistan (or its airspace) for a period of thirty consecutive days or sixty non-consecutive days.  The medal is retroactive to October 24, 2001, and was active until the conclusion of Operation Allies Refuge on August 31, 2021.  Personnel who have been engaged in combat with an enemy force, or personnel who have been wounded in combat within Afghanistan, may receive the ACM regardless of the number of days spent within the country. The medal was also awarded posthumously to any service member who died in the line of duty within Afghanistan, including from non-combat injuries such as accidents and mishaps.

Campaign phases and devices
The following are the approved campaign phases and respective dates for the Afghanistan Campaign Medal:

Examples of campaign stars worn on the Afghanistan Campaign Medal service ribbon:

The following ribbon devices are authorized for wear on the Afghanistan Campaign Medal:

  Campaign stars (all branches)
  Arrowhead device (Army, Air Force, and Space Force)
  Fleet Marine Force Combat Operation Insignia (Navy personnel assigned to a Marine Corps unit in combat)

Global War on Terrorism Expeditionary Medal
The Afghanistan Campaign Medal replaces the Global War on Terrorism Expeditionary Medal (GWOT-EM) for service in Afghanistan and personnel who previously received the GWOT-EM for Afghanistan service may elect to exchange the medal for the ACM. Both medals may not be received for the same period of service in Afghanistan and any current Afghanistan service will only be recognized with the Afghanistan Campaign Medal.

See also
Awards and decorations of the United States military
United Kingdom Afghanistan medal

References

2004 establishments in the United States
Awards established in 2004
United States campaign medals